Ignacio de Jesus Prado Juárez (born 21 September 1993) is a Mexican professional racing cyclist, who currently rides for UCI Continental team . He won the silver medal in the men's scratch event at the 2016 UCI Track Cycling World Championships. He won the 2015 Pan American U23 Time Trial Championships gold medal.

Major results

Road

2012
 1st Stage 4 Ruta del Centro
2013
 3rd Time trial, National Under-23 Road Championships
 10th Road race, Pan American Under-23 Road Championships
2014
 1st  Time trial, National Under-23 Road Championships
 1st Stage 2 Vuelta Mexico Telmex
 2nd  Time trial, Pan American Under-23 Road Championships
2015
 1st  Time trial, Pan American Under-23 Road Championships
 National Road Championships
1st  Road race
1st  Under-23 road race
1st  Under-23 time trial
 2nd  Time trial, Pan American Games
 4th Overall Vuelta Mexico Telmex
1st  Mexican rider classification
1st  Young rider classification
1st Stage 1
2017
 1st  Time trial, National Road Championships
 4th Time trial, Pan American Road Championships
2018
 3rd Time trial, National Road Championships
 8th Time trial, Pan American Road Championships
2019
 National Road Championships
1st  Road race
2nd Time trial
 Pan American Games
2nd  Road race
8th Time trial
 3rd  Time trial, Pan American Road Championships
2020
 1st  Time trial, National Road Championships
2021
 1st  Time trial, National Road Championships

Track

2015
 Pan American Track Championships
1st  Scratch
2nd  Omnium
 2nd  Omnium, Pan American Games
2016
 2nd  Scratch, UCI Track World Championships
2017
 1st  Omnium, Pan American Track Championships
2018
 2nd  Omnium, 2018–19 UCI Track Cycling World Cup, London
 Pan American Track Championships
3rd  Omnium
3rd  Team pursuit
2019
 Pan American Track Championships
1st  Madison
2nd  Omnium
2nd  Scratch
 2nd  Omnium, Pan American Games

References

External links
 

1993 births
Living people
Mexican male cyclists
Place of birth missing (living people)
Mexican track cyclists
Cyclists at the 2015 Pan American Games
Cyclists at the 2019 Pan American Games
Olympic cyclists of Mexico
Cyclists at the 2016 Summer Olympics
Pan American Games medalists in cycling
Pan American Games silver medalists for Mexico
Medalists at the 2015 Pan American Games
Medalists at the 2019 Pan American Games
21st-century Mexican people
Competitors at the 2014 Central American and Caribbean Games
Competitors at the 2018 Central American and Caribbean Games